Somena is a genus of tussock moths in the family Erebidae. The genus was erected by Francis Walker in 1856.

Species
Somena aurantiacoides Holloway, 1999
Somena exigua (Nietner, 1861)
Somena pulverea (Leech, 1888)
Somena moorei (Snellen, 1879)
Somena scintillans Walker, 1856
Somena similis (Moore, [1860])

References

Lymantriinae
Moth genera